The 2022 Prairie View A&M Panthers football team represented Prairie View A&M University as a member of the West Division of Southwestern Athletic Conference (SWAC) during the 2022 NCAA Division I FCS football season. Led by first-year head coach Bubba McDowell, the Panthers compiled an overall record of 6–5 with mark of 5–3 in conference play, sharing the SWAC West Division title with Southern. Prairie View A&M played home games at Panther Stadium at Blackshear Field in Prairie View, Texas.

Schedule
Prairie View A&M finalized their 2022 schedule on February 3, 2022.

References

Prairie View AandM
Prairie View A&M Panthers football seasons
Prairie View AandM football